The MRO is a Russian self-contained, disposable single shot 72.5 mm rocket launcher.

Technical specification
MRO series
 Calibre: 72.5 mm
 Length: 900 mm
 Weight: 4.7 kg
 Effective Range: 90 m
 Maximum Range: 450 m
 Variants: MRO-A (Thermobaric warhead), MRO-D (WP Smoke warhead), MRO-Z (Incendiary warhead)

Users
 
  Donetsk People's Republic

References 

Rocket-propelled grenade launchers
Weapons of Russia
Modern thermobaric weapons of Russia
Modern incendiary weapons of Russia
Rocket weapons
Bazalt products
Military equipment introduced in the 2000s